Jalikan-e Olya (also Romanized as Jalīkān-e ‘Olyā; also known as Jalīkān and Jalīkān-e Bālā) is a village in Mianrud Rural District, Chamestan District, Nur County, Mazandaran Province, Iran. At the 2006 census, its population was 548, in 142 families.

References 

Populated places in Nur County